Prevertebral ganglia (or collateral ganglia, or preaortic ganglia) lie between the sympathetic ganglia and the target organ.

Function

Similar to the paravertebral ganglia, the prevertebral ganglia are the nodules where preganglionic neurons synapse with their postganglionic counterparts. The nerves that synapse in the prevertebral ganglia innervate the pelvic viscera. Some of the targets present in the pelvic viscera include the enteric nervous system, as well as the renal system, bladder, and any other organs present in the abdomen.

Physiology

Nerves arising from the lateral horn of the spinal cord are those of the autonomic nervous system. They exit through the ventral root of the spinal cord, and continue through the ventral rami. At that point, they sharply branch to go through the white ramus communicans of the paravertebral body. Unlike the thoracic and cutaneous nerves, the ANS nerves destined for the pelvic viscera continue through the paravertebral ganglia without synapsing. Instead of synapsing, they continue through splanchnic nerves until they reach a prevertebral ganglia (located proximally to their target organ). Once inside the prevertebral ganglia, the individual neurons comprising the nerve synapse with their postganglionic neuron. The postganglionic nerve then proceeds to innervate their targets (pelvic visceral organs).

Examples
These include

1. the celiac ganglia (which can include the aorticorenal ganglion),

2. superior mesenteric ganglia, and

3. inferior mesenteric ganglia.

See also
 Autonomic ganglion
 Prevertebral plexus
 Dogiel cells

Additional images

References

External links
 

Sympathetic nervous system